The Play-offs of the 2006 Fed Cup Europe/Africa Zone Group I were the final stages of the Group I Zonal Competition involving teams from Europe and Africa. Those that qualified for this stage placed first and second in their respective pools, and also last in their pools.

The eight top teams were then randomly paired up the team from a different placing of another group for a play-off tie, with the winners being promoted to the World Group II play-offs. The four bottom teams were also randomly paired up in play-off ties with the losers being relegated down to Group II for 2007.

Promotion play-offs

Slovakia vs. Great Britain

  advanced to the World Group II play-offs, where they were drawn against . They won 5–0, and thus advanced to the World Group II for next year.

Serbia and Montenegro vs. Israel

  advanced to the World Group II play-offs, where they were drawn against . However, the Indonesians pulled out of the tie to protest the violence that occurred in the Gaza Strip at that time of the year. Israel thus progressed to the 2007 World Group II.

Relegation play-offs

South Africa vs. Sweden

  was relegated down to Group II for next year, where they placed third overall.

Finland vs. Ukraine

  was relegated down to Group II for next year, where they placed last in their pool of three, and lost in their relegation play-off. The Finns therefore played in the 2008 Group III.

See also
Fed Cup structure

References

External links
 Fed Cup website

2006 Fed Cup Europe/Africa Zone